The Neosho Daily News is a twice weekly (Tuesday and Friday) broadsheet newspaper published in Neosho, Missouri. In 2021, it was purchased by Neosho residents Jimmy and Rhonda Sexton from Gannett.

The paper covers Neosho and Newton County, Missouri, including Diamond, Goodman, Granby and Seneca.  A regular feature of the paper is the "My Life" column by Judy Haas Smith, a Neosho resident and former writer for Life magazine.

History

The Neosho Daily Democrat began publication in 1904 or 1905 with William G. Anderson its first owner and editor.  The paper was published Monday through Saturday.  By 1930, James G. Anderson was added to the masthead as publisher.<ref>Neosho Daily Democrat, 11 June 193, p. 2</ref>  In 1940, the paper is still controlled by the Andersons.

In 1952, the name changed to The Neosho Daily News and in 1953 the paper absorbed its competitor, The Neosho Times,'' which dated from November 16, 1869.  At that time, its circulation exceeded 7700.  Howard Bush was the publisher.

References 

Newspapers published in Missouri
Newton County, Missouri